Sir Iain Johnstone Sutherland  (15 June 1925 – 1 July 1986) was a British diplomat and Ambassador to the Soviet Union between 1982 and 1985.

Early career
Iain Sutherland's parents were the Scottish artists David Macbeth Sutherland and Dorothy Johnstone. He was born in Edinburgh in 1925 and was educated at Fettes College, The University of Aberdeen and Balliol College, Oxford. Sutherland served with the Royal Artillery from 1944 to 1947, and entered the Diplomatic Service in 1950. Initially training in Russian, he was posted to Belgrade in 1956, became Head of Chancery in Havana, Cuba in 1959 and was posted to Washington in 1962 immediately after the Cuban Missile Crisis He was appointed Consul-general in Jakarta in 1967 and became head of the Foreign Office's South Asia department from 1969 to 1973 before being appointed as Minister in Moscow in 1974. After a sabbatical and fellowship in International Affairs at Harvard University, Sutherland was appointed British Ambassador to Greece in 1978 until 1982.

Ambassador to Russia
Sutherland's tenure in Moscow from 1982 to 1985 was overshadowed by the Soviet Occupation of Afghanistan and the expulsion of Soviet Spies from the United Kingdom at a time of increased tension often called the Second Cold War. Sutherland retired from his post in 1985.

Death

Sutherland collapsed from a heart attack whilst waiting for a train at Bond Street tube station, London. He was taken to the Westminster Hospital but later died aged 61 and is buried on the east side of Highgate Cemetery.

His wife Jeanne survives him and has written an autobiography of her experiences during the Cold War, From Moscow to Cuba and Beyond: A Diplomatic Memoir of the Cold War and also the significant changes during the educational reforms in the last years of the Soviet Union and afterwards in the Russian Federation.

References

1925 births
1986 deaths
Burials at Highgate Cemetery
Knights Commander of the Order of St Michael and St George
People educated at Fettes College
Alumni of Balliol College, Oxford
Ambassadors of the United Kingdom to Greece
Ambassadors of the United Kingdom to the Soviet Union
Diplomats from Edinburgh
Cold War
British Army personnel of World War II
Royal Artillery personnel
Military personnel from Edinburgh